The Worcester Foundation for Biomedical Research (WFBR) was a non-profit biomedical research institute based in Shrewsbury, Massachusetts, United States.

History
The foundation was established as an independent research center under the name Worcester Foundation for Experimental Biology (WFEB) in 1944 by Hudson Hoagland and Gregory Pincus. It was best known for the development of the combined oral contraceptive pill by Pincus and Min Chueh Chang, an important development in modern birth control, and for pioneering research on in vitro fertilization by Chang. In the 1970s, WFEB scientists undertook the first systematic study of anti-tumor effects of the anti-estrogen tamoxifen led by 2003 Kettering Prize recipient V. Craig Jordan and initial studies of aromatase inhibitors by 2005 Kettering prize recipient Angela Brodie, two important classes of drugs to treat breast cancer.

In the 1950s and 1960s, the WFEB sponsored a Pre-Collegiate Science Summer Program, similar to, but shorter-lived than, the Jackson Laboratory's Summer Student Program in Maine. Selected high school juniors and seniors spent several weeks living in the dormitories of nearby Saint Mark's School and doing advanced biochemical lab work under the guidance of St. Mark's teachers, Frederick R. Avis and Anna Pliscz. After studying the anatomy of mice in Avis' textbook, About Mice and Man, they performed surgery on them, using anesthesia and sterile techniques similar to those used in human surgery. They also transplanted tumors from one mouse to another, isolated 17-ketosteroids from their own urine, and did blood counts and manometric oxygen consumption measurements on bovine livers and kidneys maintained in a perfusion apparatus, among other experiments.

Name change and closure
In 1995, the foundation's name was changed to the Worcester Foundation for Biomedical Research to better reflect its increased focus on medical research. The institution ran into severe financial troubles and was taken over by the University of Massachusetts Medical School (UMMS) in 1997. The facility at 222 Maple Avenue, Shrewsbury, Massachusetts is currently operated by UMMS. The Hoagland-Pincus Conference Center at this site now hosts small scientific seminars, meetings, and retreats. The site is now home to the Center for Mindfulness in Medicine, Health Care, and Society, led by Dr. Jon Kabat-Zinn, at UMMS.

References

External links
Chang, Min Chueh, "Recollections of 40 years at the Worcester Foundation for Experimental Biology" on PubMed
About Mice and Men

Shrewsbury, Massachusetts
Medical research institutes in Massachusetts
Medical and health organizations based in Massachusetts